Friedrich von Hessen-Darmstadt (September 18, 1677, Darmstadt – October 18 1708, Chavusy) was a prince of Hesse-Darmstadt and Russian General.

Frederick was the youngest son of Landgrave Louis VI. of Hesse-Darmstadt (1630-1678) and Elisabeth Dorothea of Saxe-Gotha-Altenburg (1640-1709). Frederick entered service in Rome 1697, like his three older brothers George, Philip and Henry, in protest of his mother, a zealous Protestant. Later he entered the Russian service under Peter the Great and was appointed Lieutenant-General of the cavalry. He participated, along with Peter, in the battle of Lesnaya against the Swedes, where he was mortally wounded during a musket exchange. Friedrich was brought to Chavusy in order to recover but died there on October 18, 1708, four days after Lesnaya. Frederick had contributed significantly to the victory of the battle and was permitted the completion of a Catholic church during his burial, by Tsar Peter I.

Literature
Andreas Räss: Die Convertiten seit der Reformation pp. 468
Carl Friedrich Günther. Anekdoten, Charakterschilderungen und Denkwürdigkeiten aus der Hessischen ...  pp. 154

Friedrich
Russian military personnel of the Great Northern War
1677 births
1708 deaths
Russian generals
Sons of monarchs